The Vickers Viking was a British single-engine amphibious aircraft designed for military use shortly after World War I. Later versions of the aircraft were known as the Vickers Vulture and Vickers Vanellus.

Design and development

Research on Vickers' first amphibious aircraft type began in December 1918 with tests of alternative fuselage/hull designs occurring in an experimental tank at St Albans in Hertfordshire, England. A prototype, registered G-EAOV, was a five-seat cabin biplane with a pusher propeller driven by a Rolls-Royce Falcon water-cooled V 12 engine. Sir John Alcock died taking this aircraft to the Paris exhibition on 18 December 1919, whilst trying to land at Côte d'Evrard, near Rouen, Normandy in foggy weather.

The next example, G-EASC, known as the Viking II, had a greater wing span and a 360 hp Rolls-Royce Eagle VIII motor. The Viking III machine, piloted by Captain Stan Cockerell, won first prize in the amphibian class in Air Ministry competitions held in September and October, 1920.

The Type 54 Viking IV incorporated further refinements and had a wider cabin above a hull one foot wider, an example being G-EBBZ in which Ross Smith and J.M. Bennett (partners in the 1919 England to Australia flight) died on 13 April 1922 just outside the Brooklands racetrack near Weybridge in Surrey. Most of these Mark IV Vikings had a Napier Lion engine.

The next version was the Viking V; two were built for the RAF for service in Iraq.

A further development with a redesigned wing structure using the 450 hp (340 kW) Napier Lion would have been the Viking VI (Vickers designation Type 78) but known as the Vulture I. A second with a Rolls-Royce Eagle IX (360 hp, 270 kW) was the Type 95 Vulture II. Both Vultures were used for an unsuccessful around the world attempt in 1924 after the Eagle engine of the Vulture II was replaced with a Lion. With registration G-EBHO, the first set off from Calshot Seaplane Base on 25 March 1924, the other was shipped as a spare machine to Tokyo. After mechanical difficulties in earlier stages G-EBHO crashed at Akyab where it was replaced by G-EBGO on 25 June. Encountering heavy fog on the Siberian side of the Bering Sea G-EBGO crashed. Vickers salvaged a large proportion.

The Viking Mark VII ("Type 83" in Vickers numbering) was a development of the Vulture, a three-seat open-cockpit fleet spotter to Air Ministry specification 46/22 given the service name "Vanellus" when taken on for evaluation by the RAF against the Supermarine Seagull design.

Operational history
The last Viking amphibians were built during 1923, but the name was re-used for the twin-engine VC.1 Viking airliner some 22 years later, which saw service as the Valetta with the RAF and other air arms. Some Viking amphibians were built by Canadian Vickers Limited, a subsidiary company in Montreal with no previous aircraft manufacturing experience. Their involvement with the Viking led to a future line of indigenous flying boats beginning with the Canadian Vickers Vedette.

No Vikings survive today although a full-size replica built for the film The People That Time Forgot (1977) is displayed at Brooklands Museum in Surrey.

Operators

 Argentine Air Force
 Argentine Naval Aviation – four Type 84 (Viking IV) delivered in 1923, supplemented by two ex-civil Viking IVs in 1925.
 River Plate Aviation Company (Compañia Rio Platense de Aviación) – One Type 73 and one Type 77 (both Viking IVs) delivered in 1923. Sold to Argentine Navy in 1925.

 Laurentide Air Services – One Type 69 (Viking IV) delivered in 1922.
 Royal Canadian Air Force – two Type 85 (Viking IV) delivered in 1923 followed by six built in Canada by Canadian Vickers at Montreal.

 French Navy – One Type 54 (Viking IV) delivered in 1921 with civilian markings.

 Imperial Japanese Navy – two Type 58 (Viking IV) delivered in 1921.

 Royal Netherlands East Indies Army Air Force – Eight Type 55 (Viking IV) delivered in 1922 followed two attrition replacements in 1923.

 One Type 64 (Viking IV) ordered by the Russian Trade Delegation delivered in 1922.

 Royal Air Force – two Type 59 (Viking V) delivered in 1922 for tropical trials with No. 70 Squadron RAF.
 Royal Navy – one Viking III delivered in 1921, one Vanellus delivered 1925

 United States Navy – one Type 58 (Viking IV) purchased by the US Navy in 1921 and delivered in 1923.

Specifications (Viking IV)

See also

References
Notes

Bibliography

 Andrews, C.F. and E.B. Morgan. Vickers Aircraft since 1908. London: Putnam, 1988. .
 London, Peter. British Flying Boats. Stroud, UK: Sutton Publishing, 2003. .
 Milberry, Larry. Aviation in Canada. Toronto: McGraw-Hill Ryerson Ltd., 1979. .
 Molson, Ken M. and Harold A. Taylor. Canadian Aircraft Since 1909. Stittsville, Ontario: Canada's Wings, Inc., 1982. .
 Rivas, Santiago. British Combat Aircraft in Latin America. Manchester, UK: Crécy Publishing, 2019. .

External links

 "The Vickers Viking Mark IV", Flight, 6 October 1921, pages 655–660 detailed photos and drawings
 Vickers Viking entry at the Lancaster Museum website
 Canadian Air Force historical aircraft

Viking
1910s British military utility aircraft
Flying boats
Amphibious aircraft
Single-engined pusher aircraft
Biplanes
Aircraft first flown in 1919